A by-election was held for the New South Wales Legislative Assembly electorate of Goulburn on 20 July 1974 because Country Party member Ron Brewer resigned to contest the 1974 federal election for Eden-Monaro. Brewer was defeated by 146 votes, and re-contested Goulburn.

Dates

Candidates
 Dermid McDermott, the Labor Party candidate, was the son of the Mayor of Goulburn. This was the only time he would contest a Legistaive Assembly election.
 Ron Brewer, the Country Party candidate, was the former member recontesting the seat.

Results

Ron Brewer resigned to unsuccessfully contest the 1974 federal election for Eden-Monaro.

See also
Electoral results for the district of Goulburn
List of New South Wales state by-elections

Notes

References

1974 elections in Australia
New South Wales state by-elections
1970s in New South Wales
July 1974 events in Australia